William Jacobs may refer to:
W. W. Jacobs (1863–1943), short story writer
William H. Jacobs (1831–1882), Wisconsin legislator and banker
Will Jacobs (born 1955), American comics writer
William Elmer Jacobs, baseball player
William Jacobs (producer) (1887–1953), film producer
William R. Jacobs Jr. (born 1955), professor of microbiology, immunology and genetics

See also
William Jacob (disambiguation)